Aviation News is a British aviation magazine covering current military and civil aviation topics. It was first published in 1972 and is currently published by Key Publishing Ltd.

History and profile
The magazine was founded in 1972 as a fortnightly tabloid newspaper-style publication by Alan W. Hall (Publications) Ltd. It included a variety of current news, feature articles (contemporary and historical) and other information for the aviation enthusiast, including scale drawings of a different aircraft type in each issue.

In July 1983 (Volume 12 Number 1) it changed to an A4 format magazine with more pages. In 1995 the publishers of Air Pictorial magazine, HPC Publishing, acquired the title. Aviation News was incorporated into Air Pictorial the following year as a monthly magazine; however, the magazine reverted to the Aviation News name in 2002. In 2010 Aviation News was acquired by Key Publishing. Since then, other aviation titles such as Classic Aircraft and Jets have been incorporated into the magazine.

References

External links 

Aviation magazines
Transport magazines published in the United Kingdom
Magazines established in 1972
Monthly magazines published in the United Kingdom
Mass media in Lincolnshire